The kinglet calyptura (Calyptura cristata) is a small passerine bird. It is the only member of the genus Calyptura in the family Tyrannidae. It had traditionally been considered a member of the family Cotingidae.
It is endemic to Atlantic forest in south-eastern Brazil. For a long time this species was feared to be extinct, as it went unrecorded during the 20th century until two birds were observed in Serra dos Órgãos on several days in October 1996. Since these sightings, there have not been any confirmed records, although at least one recent—but unconfirmed—record exists from near Ubatuba. Consequently, it is considered Critically Endangered by BirdLife International.

Taxonomy
The kinglet calyptura was initially described as Pardalotus cristatus by Louis Jean Pierre Vieillot in 1818 in the Nouveau Dictionnaire d'Histoire Naturelle on the basis of a specimen collected near Rio de Janeiro. It was later placed in the monotypic genus Calyptura, whose name comes from the Ancient Greek words καλύπτω "to cover", and ούρά "tail", a reference to the kinglet calyptura's very short tail which hardly projects beyond the species' tail-coverts. The specific name cristata comes from the Latin word "cristatus" crested.

Another common name for the species is Kinglet Cotinga.

Description

When classified as a cotinga, it was the smallest known species of that family.

The kinglet calyptura's call has been described as brief, hoarse, and disagreeable, as well as surprisingly loud for a bird of its size.

Distribution and habitat
Due to the paucity of records for this species, most information about their habitat is circumstantial. It has been hypothesized by BirdLife International that these birds are altitudinal migrants due to their diet. This bird can tolerate secondary forest but it is usually restricted to foothill forest.

Ecology and behavior
The kinglet calyptura is normally found in pairs. This species forages by climbing in all directions on lianas, eating insects or small berries depending on the season. It has a preference for fruits from the Marianeira, which is the Brazilian name for two different species of shrub in the family Solanaceae, Acnistus cauliflorus and Aureliana lucida. The species has also been observed exploring the rosettes of bromeliad leaves in which dew collects.

General information
The kinglet calyptura is a bird from South American and known only from specimens dating back to the 19th Century. It was placed in the Cotingidae, but is more closely related to the Platyrinchus and Neopipo. These genera also help make up the Rhynchocyclidae (tody-tyrants and flatbills) and Tyrannidae (typical tyrant flycatchers). Its taxonomic history is almost non-existent because there is not much behavioral and anatomical data to study. Habitat loss is most likely to have caused its endangerment, but altitudinal migration and specialization could have also played a role. It seems to inhabit higher and wider places with its main food resource being insects, seeds and berries. Instead of remaining high in the trees, it tends to travel through the shrubberies on the ground. There are also no remnants of its skeleton stored anywhere. It is currently considered an endangered species by BirdLife International.

Threats to environment and recent sightings
It is endemic to Atlantic forest in south-eastern Brazil, which has seen heavy rise in deforestation and pollution due to industrialization of the country. From the kinglet calyptura's earliest documentations in the 19th Century and fossil evidence from the early 20th Century, there is no reason to believe that it was not uncommon to encounter the bird in the wild (BirdLife International). For a long time this species was feared to be extinct, with threats to the environment doing little to quell those fears. Projects in the 1970s, including the construction of a bridge connecting the area to Rio de Janeiro, have resulted in high amounts of toxic metals such as lead, zinc and copper in this bird's habitat (Neto, Smith, McAllister). Lambert and Kirwan maintain that the lack of sightings is primarily due to the fact that researchers simply cannot explore high areas of the rainforest because they are inaccessible to humans. 
Contradicting this is the fact that deforestation in Brazil has led to the displacement of as many as 93% of Atlantic birds situated there (Loiselle, Graham, Goerck, Ribeiro). With those numbers in mind, there is no more reason to speculate that the species may be extinct or may have completely relocated to an unknown location. Sightings of the species have been sporadic, with the last official sighting of the bird in Serra dos Orgaos for several days in October 1996. Since these sightings, there have not been any confirmed records, although at least one recent-but unconfirmed- record exists from near Ubatuba. Consequently, it is considered Critically Endangered.

References

Cited texts
 
 
Guy, Kirwan M. The Wilson Journal of Ornithology, Rep. N.p: Wilson Ornithological Society, 120(4)”923-925.2008.Aves Brasileiras E Plantas Que as Atraem [Brazilian Birds and Plants That Attract Them].
 “Calyptura Cristata.” (Kinglet Calyptura, Kinglet Cotinga). N.p. n.d. Web 26 October. 2012. http://oldredlist.iucnredlist.org/details/summary/106004493/0.
Lambert, Frank, and Buy M. Kirwan. “The Twice-vanishing ‘paradalote’:what future for the Kinglet Calyptura?”
Loiselle, B. A., Graham, C. H., Goerck, J. M., and Ribeirto, M. C. (2010), Assessing the impact of deforestation and climate change on the range size and environmental niche of bird species in the Atlantic forests, Brazil. Journal of Biogeography, 37:1288-1301. doi:10.1111/j.1256-2699.2010.02285.x

External links
BirdLife Species Factsheet.

Tyrannidae
Birds of the Atlantic Forest
Endemic birds of Brazil
Birds described in 1818
Taxa named by Louis Jean Pierre Vieillot
Taxonomy articles created by Polbot